Dəlləkli (also, Dellyakli and Dallakly) is a village and municipality in the Masally Rayon of Azerbaijan.  It has a population of 173.

References 

Populated places in Masally District